The 1990 Liga Semi-Pro Divisyen 1 season is the second season of Liga Semi-Pro Divisyen 1. A total of 10 teams participated in the season.

Perlis, Perak and Sabah were promoted from 1989 Liga Semi-Pro Divisyen 2 to a now increased total number of teams competing in the league from nine to become ten teams.

Under the new format, only the top six teams in Divisyen 1 and the Divisyen 2 champions and runners-up will be involved in the Malaysia Cup. Malaysia Cup was played from the quarter-final stage, scheduled for November after the league was finished. The Malaysia Cup quarter-final and semi-final matches will be played on a home and away basis.

The season kicked off on 5 May 1990. Selangor ended up the season by winning the title.

Teams
10 teams competing in the second season of Liga Semi-Pro Divisyen 1.

 Selangor (1990 Liga Semi-Pro Divisyen 1 champions)
 Singapore
 Perak
 Kuala Lumpur
 Johor
 Kedah
 Pahang
 Sabah
 Perlis (Relegated to Liga Semi-Pro Divisyen 2)
 Sarawak (Relegated to Liga Semi-Pro Divisyen 2)

League Table:-

1.Selangor  - 25 PTS (1990 Liga Semi-Pro Divisyen 1 champions)

2.Singapore  - 25 PTS

3.Perak  - 24 PTS

4.Johor  - 20 PTS

5.Kuala Lumpur  - 19 PTS

6.Kedah  - 19 PTS

7.Pahang  - 18 PTS

8.Sabah  - 15 PTS

9.Perlis  - 11 PTS (Relegated to 1991 Liga Semi-Pro Divisyen 2)

10.Sarawak  - 5 PTS (Relegated to 1991 Liga Semi-Pro Divisyen 2)

Champions

References

Liga Semi-Pro Divisyen 1 seasons
1
Malaysia